4x2 may refer to:

A four-wheeled two-wheel drive vehicle
4 inch × 2 inch profile dimensional lumber
4 × 200 metres relay, an athletics track event
4X2=8, a 2017 album by Psy
OR4X2, olfactory receptor 4X2, a protein

See also
2×4 (disambiguation)